Kenneth Pereira (born July 12, 1973 in Toronto, Ontario) is a field hockey midfielder from Canada. He was a member of the Canadian field hockey team at the Summer Olympics in 2000 and 2008. Pereira has also been on several Commonwealth Games and Pan American Games teams, winning two gold medals in the latter competition in 1999 and 2007. In the 1999 Pan American Games gold-medal match against Argentina, the only goal in Canada's win was posted by Pereira.

References

External links
 
 
 
 
 
 
 

1973 births
Living people
Canadian male field hockey players
Field hockey players at the 1998 Commonwealth Games
Field hockey players at the 2000 Summer Olympics
Field hockey players at the 2002 Commonwealth Games
Field hockey players at the 2006 Commonwealth Games
Field hockey players at the 2007 Pan American Games
Field hockey players at the 2008 Summer Olympics
Field hockey players at the 2011 Pan American Games
Olympic field hockey players of Canada
Field hockey players from Toronto
Canadian sportspeople of Indian descent
Canadian people of Goan descent
World Series Hockey players
Commonwealth Games competitors for Canada
Pan American Games gold medalists for Canada
Pan American Games silver medalists for Canada
Pan American Games medalists in field hockey
1998 Men's Hockey World Cup players
Male field hockey midfielders
HGC players
Medalists at the 2007 Pan American Games
Medalists at the 2011 Pan American Games
2010 Men's Hockey World Cup players